William Niles may refer to:
 William Woodruff Niles, bishop of the Episcopal Diocese of New Hampshire
 William E. Niles, farmer, businessman and political figure in Canada West
 Bill Niles, Major League Baseball player